Fetus or foetus refers to a stage in prenatal development.

Fetus or Foetus may also refer to: 
 Foetus (band)
 Foetus (film), a 1994 Hungarian film
 Fetus in fetu, a developmental abnormality
 Campylobacter fetus, a species of bacteria